Hyslop Sports Center is an  indoor arena on the campus of the University of North Dakota in Grand Forks, North Dakota.

The arena holds 4,500 spectators and opened in 1951.  Hyslop Sports Center is named in honor of William Kenneth Hyslop (1885–1981), a 1906 graduate of the University of North Dakota and major benefactor to the university.

The center was primarily used for basketball and volleyball until the Betty Engelstad Sioux Center opened in 2004. The building's first indoor pool was added in 1955. The center is used principally for indoor track and field and swimming and diving.

References

External links
Hyslop Sports Center website

Defunct college basketball venues in the United States
College volleyball venues in the United States
Sports venues in North Dakota
Buildings and structures in Grand Forks, North Dakota
Basketball venues in North Dakota
1951 establishments in North Dakota
Sports venues completed in 1951
Indoor track and field venues in the United States
College indoor track and field venues in the United States
College swimming venues in the United States